Otank (Utanga) is a Tivoid language of Nigeria. It is close to Tiv proper.

References

Languages of Nigeria
Languages of Cameroon
Tivoid languages